Eva Birthistle (born 1974) is an Irish actress and writer. She is best known for her roles in Bad Sisters and Ae Fond Kiss..., and since 2015 has starred in The Last Kingdom. She won the London Film Critics Circle British or Irish Actress of the Year Award in 2004, and has twice won the IFTA Best Actress in a Leading Role (Film) award.

Early life and education
Birthistle was born in Bray, County Wicklow, Ireland, but moved with her family to Derry, Northern Ireland when she was 14. She was raised Catholic but attended the non-denominational Foyle College. After her GCSEs, she studied acting at The Gaiety School of Acting in Dublin.

Career
In 1995, she got her first TV role as Regina Crosbie in the serial Glenroe. She stayed for three years until 1998. She was offered her first feature film in 1997, All Souls' Day by Alan Gilsenan. She played a variety of roles in Irish films, including Drinking Crude (1997), co-starring Colin Farrell, and TV movie Miracle at Midnight (1998), with Mia Farrow. In 2002, Eva appeared in Sunday, a dramatisation of the events of Bloody Sunday written by Jimmy McGovern.

In 2003, she appeared in the TV series Trust before starring as Roisin Hanlon in the Ken Loach movie Ae Fond Kiss... (2003–04), which won her the 2005 London Critics Circle Film Award as "British Actress of the Year". She appeared in Breakfast on Pluto, Imagine Me & You and Save Angel Hope (by Lukas Erni) in 2005, and in Brian Kirk's Middletown in 2006. She starred as human rights lawyer Jane Lavery in the TV conspiracy drama The State Within, and played Rosaleen in the Taken at the Flood episode of Agatha Christie's Poirot in 2006. In late 2007, she featured as Rembrandt's wife Saskia van Uylenburg in the historical drama, Nightwatching by Peter Greenaway.

She featured in the BBC drama The Last Enemy in early 2008, playing the role of Eleanor Brooke, a junior minister. In 2009, she portrayed Jenette in the last episode of the second season of the BBC hit series Ashes to Ashes. She also appeared in two successful horror films The Children (2008) and Wake Wood (2011). In 2010, she won Best Actress at the Myrtle Beach International Film Festival for her acclaimed performance as a lovelorn paralegal in Curt Truninger's The Rendezvous.

She played "Annette Nicholls" in the 2010 three-part TV series Five Daughters. She appeared as Detective Superintendent Sarah Cavendish in the ninth, and final, series of Waking the Dead. In 2011, Birthistle appeared in the Sky1 TV series Strike Back: Project Dawn as Captain Kate Marshall. In 2013, Birthistle co-starred with Anna Friel in the Sky1 TV production The Psychopath Next Door. In Brooklyn she played Georgina, the cabin-mate of Eilis (Saoirse Ronan), mentoring her in surviving the voyage to New York and dealing with immigration to the US. In 2014, she portrayed Sarah Bailey in the miniseries Amber. Since 2015, she has starred in The Last Kingdom as Hild, a nun turned warrior and friend of Uhtred of Bebbanburg.
She appeared in the 2017 Irish film The Delinquent Season opposite Cillian Murphy.

Personal life
Birthistle's husband, Ross, is an acupuncturist. They have a son, Jesse, born in 2013, and a daughter, Joni (named after Joni Mitchell) born in 2017.

References

External links

Living people
1974 births
Actresses from County Wicklow
Irish film actresses
Irish television actresses
People from Bray, County Wicklow
Writers from Derry (city)
Actors from Derry (city)